Martin Brandlmayr is an Austrian percussionist, drummer, composer and electronic artist.

He is widely recognized for his work in a variety of so-called "post-rock" bands, namely Radian, Trapist, and Autistic Daughters,  among others. Critic Brian Olewnick has called Brandlmayr's work "extraordinarily precise".

Among others, Brandlmayr has recorded or performed with John Tilbury, Fennesz, Chad Taylor, and Otomo Yoshihide.

He was artist in residence 2002 at Podewil, Berlin. He now lives in Vienna, Austria and is an active member of Polwechsel.

Releases
 Radian "radian" CD, Rhiz 1998
 Radian "tg 11" CD, Mego/Rhiz, 2000
 Trapist "Highway my friend" CD, Hathut, 2002
 Radian "rec.extern" CD, Thrilljockey, 2002
 Mapstation "version train" CD/LP, Staubgold, 2002
 Siewert/Brandlmayr "Too Beautiful To Burn" CD, Erstwhile records, 2003
 Brandlmayr/Dafeldecker/Nemeth/Siewert "Die Instabilitaet der Symmetrie" CD, 2004
 Kapital Band 1(CD/CDR Mosz, 2004)
 Trapist, ''Ballroom (CD, Thrilljockey, 2004)
 Radian "Juxtaposition", CD/LP, Thrilljockey, 2004
 Autistic daughters "Jealousy and diamonds" CD, Kranky 2004 / LP Staubgold 2004
 Martin Brandlmayr "manual mode", Vinyl 7inch, Ideal records, January 2005
 Werner Dafeldecker, Martin Brandlmayr, Christian Fennesz "Till The Old World's Blown Up And A New One Is Created", CD, Mosz, 2008
 Radian "Chimeric", CD/LP, Thrilljockey 2009
 Otomo Yoshihide / Axel Dörner / Sachiko M / Martin Brandlmayr "Allurements Of The Elliposid", 2CD, Neos, 2010
 David Sylvian "Sleepwalkers", CD, SamadhiSound, 2010
 eRikm / Brandlmayr "Ecotone", CD, Mikroton Recordings, 2014

References

External links
 Radian
 Trapist
 Kapital Band 1

Living people
Year of birth missing (living people)
Austrian male musicians
Place of birth missing (living people)
Musicians from Berlin
Musicians from Vienna